Franks Corner is an unincorporated community located within East Allen Township in Northampton County, Pennsylvania. It is part of the Lehigh Valley metropolitan area, which had a population of 861,899 and was the 68th most populous metropolitan area in the United States as of the 2020 census.

Geography
Franks Corner is located at the intersection between Airport Road (Pennsylvania Route 987) and North Bath Boulevard (Pennsylvania Route 329). From this junction, Pennsylvania Route 987 and Pennsylvania Route 329 continue concurrently eastward.

Franks Corner is home to two small communities- Spring Lake Village, on Airport Road, and Jacksonville, on Nor-Bath Blvd. A small tributary of the Catasaqua Creek runs through the area, fed by a pond at Seiple Farms.

References

Unincorporated communities in Northampton County, Pennsylvania
Unincorporated communities in Pennsylvania